Senator Thorp may refer to:

Herman Thorp (1809–1892), Wisconsin State Senate
Joseph G. Thorp (1812–1895), Wisconsin State Senate

See also
Frederick Thorpe (fl. 1860s–1870s), Wisconsin State Senate